The Raven's Dance is a 1980 Finnish film directed by Markku Lehmuskallio. It was entered into the 30th Berlin International Film Festival, where it won an Honourable Mention.

Cast
 Pertti Kalinainen as Petteri
 Paavo Katajasaari as The father
 Hilkka Matikainen as Hilkka
 Eero Kemilä as Forester
 Mari Holappa as Neighbor
 Heikki Holappa as Neighbor

References

External links

1980 films
Finnish drama films
1980s Finnish-language films
Films directed by Markku Lehmuskallio